Alex Rolfini (born 1 September 1996) is an Italian footballer who plays as a forward for  club Vicenza.

Club career
He made his Serie C debut for Carrarese on 28 August 2016 in a game against Giana Erminio.

On 2 September 2019, he was loaned to Fermana. On 24 January 2020, he moved on another loan to Fano.

On 7 September 2020 he signed with Legnago Salus.

On 13 July 2021, he moved to Ancona-Matelica.

On 11 July 2022, Rolfini signed a two-year contract with Vicenza.

References

External links
 

1996 births
Living people
Sportspeople from the Province of Ferrara
Italian footballers
Association football forwards
Serie C players
Serie D players
A.C. Carpi players
Carrarese Calcio players
Alma Juventus Fano 1906 players
A.C. Gozzano players
Fermana F.C. players
F.C. Legnago Salus players
Ancona-Matelica players
L.R. Vicenza players
Footballers from Emilia-Romagna